Sid Bennett is a film and television director, producer and writer.

Bennett directed plenty of television shows, including Prehistoric Park (episodes 3 & 4), Predator X, I Shouldn't Be Alive and Mermaids: The Body Found. In 2012, his first film with theatrical release appeared, called The Dinosaur Project.

References

External links
 Sid Bennett's official website

British television directors
Living people
Year of birth missing (living people)
Place of birth missing (living people)